Highway 46 is a short highway in central Israel. The road, just 4 km long, was created in order to bypass the portion of Highway 40 that crosses the aviation industrial zone near Ben Gurion International Airport, a section of road that suffers from heavy traffic.

Junctions & Interchanges on the highway

See also 
List of highways in Israel

Roads in Israel